Bakhtigareyevo (Bäxtegäräy) is a rural locality (a village) in Ishmukhametovsky Selsoviet, Baymaksky District, Bashkortostan, Russia. The population was 5 as of 2010.

Geography 
It is located 13 km from Baymak and 16 km from Ishmukhametovo.

References 

Rural localities in Baymaksky District